Cosmosoma stibosticta is a moth of the subfamily Arctiinae. It was described by Arthur Gardiner Butler in 1876. It is found in Panama, Costa Rica, Colombia and Peru.

References

stibosticta
Moths described in 1876